The 2011 McDonald's All-American Boys Game was an All-star basketball game that was played on Wednesday, March 30, 2011, at the United Center in Chicago, Illinois, home of the Chicago Bulls. The game's rosters featured the best and most highly recruited high school boys graduating in 2011.  The game was the 34th annual version of the McDonald's All-American Game first played in 1978.

2011 Game
The 2011 game was played at the Chicago Bulls' United Center in Chicago, Illinois, on March 30, 2011.

2011 West Roster

2011 East Roster

Coaches
The West team was coached by:
 Head Coach Gene Pingatore of St. Joseph High School (Westchester, IL)
 Asst Coach Bill Riley of St. Joseph High School (Westchester, IL)
 Asst Coach Daryl Thomas of St. Joseph High School (Westchester, IL)

The East team was coached by:
 Head Coach Bob Cimmino of Mt. Vernon High School (Mt. Vernon, NY)
 Asst Coach Brian Pritchett of Mt. Vernon High School (Mt. Vernon, NY)
 Asst Coach Dwayne Murray of Mt. Vernon High School (Mt. Vernon, NY)

All-American Week

Schedule 

 Monday, March 28: Powerade Jamfest
 Slam Dunk Contest
 Three-Point Shoot-out
 Timed Basketball Skills Competition
 Wednesday, March 30: 34th Annual Boys All-American Game

The Powerade JamFest is a skills-competition evening featuring basketball players who demonstrate their skills in three crowd-entertaining ways.  The slam dunk contest was first held in 1987, and a 3-point shooting challenge was added in 1989.  A timed basketball skills competition was added to the schedule of events in 2009.

Contest Winners
 The 2011 Powerade Slam Dunk contest was won by LeBryan Nash.
 The winner of the 2011 3-point shoot-out was Kyle Wiltjer.
 The winner of the basketball skills competition was Michael Carter-Williams.

See also
2011 McDonald's All-American Girls Game

References

External links
McDonald's All-American on the web

2010–11 in American basketball
2011
2011 in sports in Illinois
Basketball in Illinois